Odontolabis cuvera, the golden stag beetle, is a beetle of the family Lucanidae, stag beetles.

Etymology
The Latin species name Cuvera comes from a mythical king of riches (Kubera or "Kuvera") who lived in the Himalayas.

List of subspecies
 Odontolabis cuvera alticola Möllenkamp, 1902
 Odontolabis cuvera boulouxi Lacroix, 1984
 Odontolabis cuvera cuvera Hope, 1842 (Bhutan, India, Nepal)
 Odontolabis cuvera fallaciosa Boileau, 1901 (China, Laos, Thailand, Viet Nam)
 Odontolabis cuvera gestroi Boileau, 1902 (India, Myanmar)
 Odontolabis cuvera lunulata Lacroix, 1984
 Odontolabis cuvera mandibularis Möllenkamp, 1909
 Odontolabis cuvera sinensis Westwood, 1848 (China)

Description
Moreover, males have a conspicuously elongated and large pair of mandibles. The basic color of the body is black. Elytra have broad orange margins on the outer edge. The female closely resembles the male in coloration but it lacks long mandibles.

The remarkably disparity between male and females (sexual dimorphism) evolved through sexual selection for securing mating females. The males have also three morphological forms with variations in the size of their mandibles. These three alternative phenotypes (male trimorphism) in the types of male weapons are considered conditional reproductive strategies. In Lucanidae, there has only been two species described with this trimorphic characteristic as of 2017, with the other one being Dorcus rectus.

In the subspecies Odontolabis cuvera sinensis elytra are almost completely black, with a small orange border.

Life cycle
The females lay their eggs into leaf litter substrate and rotten wood. Larvae build their cave system and stay inside it, feeding for several years on rotting wood.

Distribution
This beetle is native to southeast Asia and it is present in Bhutan, China, India, Laos, Myanmar, Nepal, Thailand, Viet Nam.

Gallery

Monograph
 Lacroix, J.-P., 1984 - The Beetles of the World, volume 4, Odontolabini I (Lucanidae) - Genera Chalcodes, Odontolabis, Heterochtes. 1984, 175 pg.

References

External links
 Large picture of male beetle

Lucaninae
cuvera
Beetles described in 1842